Kasım of Karaman (died 1493) was the last bey of the Karaman Beylik, a Turkish principality in Anatolia in the 15th century.

After a brief reign, his brother Pir Ahmet Bey lost most his beylik (principality) to the Ottoman Empire, and both brothers escaped to Akkoyunlu Turkmen's territory. With Akkoyunlu support they tried to regain their former possessions. Although they weren't able to regain their losses, Kasım allied himself with Republic of Venice, and with the help of a Venetian navy, he was briefly able to keep Silifke and the Mediterranean coast of the beylik. However, following the campaigns of Gedik Ahmed Pasha of the Ottoman Empire, he lost all of his possessions in 1475.

Nevertheless, during the Ottoman Interregnum following the death of the Ottoman sultan Mehmed II, Kasım allied himself with the pretender Cem and almost reconstructed the former Karaman beylik. However Cem was defeated by his brother Bayazıt II. After Cem escaped and took refuge with the Knights of Rhodes, Kasım acknowledged Ottoman suzerainty. He continued as an Ottoman governor in Silike until his death in 1493.

References 

Karamanids
1493 deaths
Year of birth unknown
15th-century monarchs in Asia
Ethnic Afshar people